The Pedro e Inês bridge is a footbridge opened in 2007 in the town of Coimbra in Portugal. It was designed by Cecil Balmond, Arup Group, and Portuguese civil engineer António Adão da Fonseca.

Spanning the Rio Mondego, the  structure is the city's first footbridge and has become locally known as the "bridge that doesn't meet."

Partly inspired by skipping stones, the design is created from two cantilevered walkways joining in the middle.  Each walkway is responsible for supporting the other - the two halves are displaced, giving the visual effect of a bridge that does not meet. Wallpaper magazine said the bridge "appears at first glimpse to be impossible." The balustrade is made from a clear, fractal pattern crafted in coloured blue, pink, green and yellow glass.

The bridge is named for the ill-fated affair between Pedro, the Crown Prince of Portugal, and the Queen's lady-in-waiting, Inês de Castro.

References

External links 

Work - Pedro e Inês, Balmond Studio
Footbridge over the river Mondego "Pedro e Inês", afaconsult

Business Publications 
 Arup journal

Pedestrian bridges in Portugal
Coimbra
Mondego basin
2007 establishments in Portugal
Bridges completed in 2007